St Saviour's Cathedral or variations may refer to:

Australia
 St Saviour's Cathedral, Goulburn, New South Wales

France
 Aix Cathedral
 Cayenne Cathedral
 Vabres Cathedral, a former cathedral

South Africa
 St Saviour's Cathedral, Pietermaritzburg

United Kingdom
 Southwark Cathedral, the Cathedral and Collegiate Church of St Saviour and St Mary Overie, Southwark, London

See also
 St Saviour (disambiguation)
 St Sauveur (disambiguation)
 San Salvador (disambiguation)
 St Saviour's Church (disambiguation)